= Poole Hill =

Mountain in Oregon, United States

Coordinates: 42°20′56″N 122°29′14″W

Poole Hill is a summit in the U.S. state of Oregon. The elevation is 3,848 feet (1,173 m).

Poole Hill was named in the 1860s after Arthur Pool, although the spelling differs.
